Horacio Zeballos won last year's edition, but decided not to participate this year.
Izak van der Merwe won the singles title, defeating Ricardo Mello 7–6(6), 6–3 in the finals.

Seeds

Draw

Finals

Top half

Bottom half

References
 Main Draw
 Qualifying Draw

MasterCard Tennis Cup - Singles
MasterCard Tennis Cup
Mast